John H. O'Brien was appointed the fourth Fire Commissioner of the City of New York by Mayor George B. McClellan, Jr. on January 1, 1906 and served in that position until his resignation on October 10, 1906.

References 

Year of birth missing
Year of death missing
Commissioners of the New York City Fire Department